Sido Kanhu Murmu University (SKMU), formerly Siddhu Kanhu University, is a public university situated in the Santhal Parganas region of Jharkhand state in eastern India. It has its headquarters at Dumka, the second capital of Jharkhand. The university offers both undergraduate and postgraduate courses in various streams and have 13 constituent colleges and 15 affiliated colleges across six districts of Jharkhand.

History
Sido Kanhu Murmu University was founded as Siddhu Kanhu University on 10 January 1992 by an Act of Bihar Legislative Assembly. It was carved out from Bhagalpur University now known as Tilka Manjhi Bhagalpur University.

The university was renamed as Sido Kanhu Murmu University on 6 May 2003 by an amendment made in the section 3(1) of the Jharkhand State Universities Act 2000 (Amendment). It is named after Sidhu Murmu and Kanhu Murmu, brothers who led the Santhal rebellion against the British in 1855–56.

The university was recognized by and affiliated to the Association of Indian Universities on 6 May 1993. It was granted recognition under Section 12 (B) of the UGC Act, 1956 in May 2006.

Colleges
The University have its jurisdiction extends over 6 districts - Deoghar, Dumka, Godda, Jamtara, Pakur and Sahibganj.

Affiliated colleges
This university comprises 15 affiliated colleges, which are:

Constituent colleges
This university comprises 13 constituent colleges, which are:

References

External links
 

 
Educational institutions established in 1992
1992 establishments in Bihar

State universities in Jharkhand